Bobirjon Omonov (born 11 October 2000) is an Uzbekistani Paralympic athlete, competing in shot put. He represented Uzbekistan at the 2020 Summer Paralympics.

Career
Omonov represented Uzbekistan in the men's shot put F41 event at the 2020 Summer Paralympics and won a gold medal.

References

2000 births
Living people
Paralympic athletes of Uzbekistan
Uzbekistani male shot putters
Medalists at the World Para Athletics Championships
Athletes (track and field) at the 2020 Summer Paralympics
Medalists at the 2020 Summer Paralympics
Paralympic medalists in athletics (track and field)
Paralympic gold medalists for Uzbekistan
People from Andijan
21st-century Uzbekistani people